Peristernia tulipa is a species of sea snail, a marine gastropod mollusk in the family Fasciolariidae, the spindle snails, the tulip snails and their allies.

Description
The length of the shell attains 20.3 mm.

Distribution
This species occurs in the Pacific Ocean off Mexico.

References

External links
 Lesson A. (1842). Mollusques recueillis dans la Mer du Sud, genre Buccinum Linné. Revue Zoologique par la Société Cuvierienne. 5: 237-238
 Snyder M.A. (2003). Catalogue of the marine gastropod family Fasciolariidae. Academy of Natural Sciences. of Philadelphia, Special Publication. 21iii + 1–431

Fasciolariidae
Gastropods described in 1841
Taxa named by René Lesson